Anuruddha was one of the ten principal disciples and a cousin of Gautama Buddha.

Early years
Anuruddha was the son of Amitodana and brother to Mahanama and princess Rohini (Buddha's disciple). Since Amitodana was the brother of Suddhodana, king of the Sakyas in Kapilavastu, Anuruddha was cousin to Siddhartha, (Gautama Buddha).  He was a kshatriya by birth, enabling him to be raised in wealth.  Gautama Buddha returned to his home town two years after his enlightenment, preaching his ideas to the Sakyan kingdom.  Together with his 3 cousins Bhaddiya, Ananda, and Devadatta and their servant  Upali, became ordained by the Buddha at the Anupiya Mango Grove.

Religious life
Anuruddha acquired "divine vision" (dibba-cakkhu) and was ranked foremost among those who had the ability. Sariputta assigned the eight thoughts of a great man for Anuruddha to use as a meditation topic.  Journeying into the Pacinavamsadaya in the Ceti country to practice, he was able to master seven, but could not learn the eighth, which Buddha taught him.  Anuruddha developed insight and then realized arahantship.

Depiction
Anuruddha is depicted in the Pali Canon as an affectionate and loyal bhikkhu, and stood near the Buddha in assembly.  At one point, when the Buddha was disappointed with the arguments of the monks at Kosambi, he retreated to Pacinavamsadaya to stay with Anuruddha.  In many texts, even when many distinguished monks were present, Anuruddha is often the recipient of the Buddha's questions, and answers on behalf of the sangha.

After the Buddha
Anuruddha was present when the Buddha died at Kusinara.  He was foremost in consoling the monks and admonishing their future course of action, reminding them of the Buddha's decree to follow the dharma.  As the Buddha was reclining and going through the jhanas, Ananda said to Anuruddha: "The Exalted One has attained final Nibbana, Venerable Sir."  Anuruddha, having divine vision, stated that the Buddha was absorbed in the state of "cessation," but had not yet died.  Anuruddha was consulted by the Mallas of Kusinara regarding the Buddha's last obsequies.

Later, at the First Buddhist Council, he played a notable role and was entrusted with the custody of the Anguttara Nikaya. Anuruddha died at Veluvagama in the Vajji country, in the shade of a bamboo thicket.  He was one hundred and fifty years old at the time of his death.

Depictions in the Jataka
Anuruddha is frequently depicted in the Jataka, which describes the previous reincarnations of Buddhist figures. In the time of  Padumuttara Buddha, he had been a wealthy householder.  Hearing one of the monks declared best among possessors of the celestial eye, he desired a similar honor.  He performed acts of merit, including holding a great feast of light in front of the Buddha's tomb.  In Kassapa Buddha's era he had reincarnated and was born in Varanasi; one day he placed bowls filled with ghee around the Buddha's tomb and set them alight, circumscribed the tomb throughout the night, bearing on his head a lighted bowl.

He was reborn in an impoverished family in Varanasi and was named Annabhara.  One day, while working for his master, the banker Sumana, he gave his meal to a Pratyekabuddha, Uparittha.  The banker, having heard of Annabhara's pious deed, rewarded him by helping to establish a business for him.  The king, impressed, gave him a site for a house, and when the ground beneath was excavated, yielded much buried treasure.

See also
 Gautama Buddha
 Ananda
 Second Buddhist Council

References

External links
 Anuruddha: Master of the Divine Eye by Hellmuth Hecker (translated from the German by Nyanaponika Thera)

Arhats
Foremost disciples of Gautama Buddha
5th-century BC people